The knockout stage of the 2007–08 UEFA Cup began on 13 February 2008. It was completed on 14 May 2008 with the final at the City of Manchester Stadium, Manchester. The knockout stage involves the 24 teams who finished in the top three in each of their groups in the group stage, along with the eight third-placed clubs from the Champions League group stage.

Each tie in the knockout stage, apart from the final, were played over two legs, with each team playing one leg at home. The team that has the higher aggregate score over the two legs will progress to the next round. In the event that aggregate scores finish level, the team that scored more goals away from home over the two legs will progress. If away goals are equal too, 30 minutes of extra time are played, followed by a penalty shoot-out if scores are still level.

In the final, the tie is played over just one leg at a neutral venue. If scores are level at the end of normal time in the final, extra time is played, followed by penalties if scores remain tied.

Bracket

Round of 32
The draw for the round of 32 was held on Friday, 21 December 2007 at 13:00 CET in Nyon, Switzerland. The eight group winners were drawn against the eight third-placed teams, while the eight second-placed teams were drawn against the eight teams who finished third in the Champions League groups. Teams from the same group or the same country cannot be drawn together.

The first legs were played on 13 February and 14 February 2008. The second legs were played on 21 February 2008.

|}

First leg
All times CET

Second leg
All times CET

Bayer Leverkusen won 5–1 on aggregate.

Hamburg won 3–1 on aggregate.

Marseille won 3–2 on aggregate.

1–1 on aggregate; Rangers won on away goals.

Bayern Munich won 7–3 on aggregate.

Getafe won 4–1 on aggregate.

Bolton Wanderers won 1–0 on aggregate.

2–2 on aggregate; Zenit St. Petersburg won on away goals.

Anderlecht won 3–2 on aggregate.

PSV Eindhoven won 4–1 on aggregate.

Tottenham Hotspur won 3–2 on aggregate.

Fiorentina won 3–1 on aggregate.

Everton won 8–1 on aggregate.

Sporting won 5–0 on aggregate.

Benfica won 3–2 on aggregate.

Werder Bremen won 4–0 on aggregate.

Round of 16
The draw for the Round of 16 was also held on 21 December 2007 at 13:00 CET in Nyon, Switzerland. The first legs were played on 6 March 2008. The second legs were played on 12 March and 13 March 2008.

|}

First leg
All times CET

Second leg
All times CET

3–3 on aggregate; Zenit Saint Petersburg won on away goals.

3–3 on aggregate; Bayer Leverkusen won on away goals.

2–2 on aggregate; Fiorentina won 4–2 on penalties.

1–1 on aggregate; PSV Eindhoven won 6–5 on penalties.

Bayern Munich won 6–2 on aggregate.

Getafe won 3–1 on aggregate.

Rangers won 2–1 on aggregate.

Sporting CP won 2–1 on aggregate.

Quarter-finals
The draw for the quarter-finals, semi-finals and final, which was conducted by UEFA General Secretary David Taylor and Denis Law, the ambassador for the final in Manchester, was held on Friday, 14 March 2008 at 14:00 CET in Nyon, Switzerland. The first legs were played on 3 April and the second legs were played on 10 April 2008.

|}

First leg
All times CEST

Second leg
All times CEST

Zenit Saint Petersburg won 4–2 on aggregate.

Rangers won 2–0 on aggregate.

4–4 on aggregate; Bayern Munich won on away goals.

Fiorentina won 3–1 on aggregate.

Semi-finals
The semi-final matches were played on 24 April and 1 May 2008.

|}

First leg
All times CEST

Second leg
All times CEST

Zenit Saint Petersburg won 5–1 on aggregate.

0–0 on aggregate; Rangers won 4–2 on penalties.

Final

The final was contested by Russian side Zenit Saint Petersburg and Scottish side Rangers on 14 May 2008 at the City of Manchester Stadium in Manchester, England. Zenit won the match 2–0, with goals from Igor Denisov and Konstantin Zyryanov coming in the last 20 minutes of the game to give Zenit their first UEFA Cup title.

Knockout Stage
UEFA Cup knockout phases